Goodenough College is a postgraduate residence and educational trust in Mecklenburgh Square in Bloomsbury, central London, England. Other names under which the college has been known are London House, William Goodenough House, and the London Goodenough Trust.

Profile 
Goodenough College is an educational charity that provides residential accommodation for talented British and international postgraduates and their families studying in London. The College attempts to provide community through a programme of intellectual, cultural, and social activities that aims to provide students with an international network and a global outlook.

Goodenough has residential and study facilities and provides a programme of activities whose goal is to enhance students' personal, social and intellectual development. In a typical year, the College is home to approximately 700 international postgraduate students and their families, from approximately 80 different nations.

The College is located in London and set on Mecklenburgh Square. Director of the College since April 2021 has been Alice Walpole.

History

Foundation 

Goodenough College was set up in 1930 by a group of prominent Londoners, including the chairman of Barclays Bank and founder of Barclays Bank DCO (Dominion, Colonial, and Overseas) Frederick Craufurd Goodenough. Goodenough and his friends wanted to provide collegiate life along Oxbridge lines to young men coming to London from the British dominions and colonies, who could be seen as prospective leaders of what was then a large empire. The College aimed to serve as a moot hall for its residents, and a place where they could form lasting friendships in a spirit of tolerance and understanding.

The search for a site for the new college was centred on Bloomsbury, to which the University of London was preparing a move from South Kensington. A site for sale as freehold was found between Guilford Street and Mecklenburgh Square, and the College bought it in 1930.

London House 

There were plans to design and build a new college, but this would have taken time which the governors did not want to waste. In the traditional manner of Bloomsbury's philanthropic institutions, they made a start in a small way in some of the roomy old houses on the site. London House first opened its doors in October 1931, in Nos. 4–7 Caroline Place (now Mecklenburgh Place) on the west side of the site. The house was soon full, with a long waiting list, and by the start of World War II it occupied all the Caroline Place properties.

A new London House for 300 single students was built between 1935 and 1963 to the designs of the architect Herbert Baker, his partner Alexander Scott, and their successor Vernon Helbing. It was completed in three stages:

Stage 1 (1935–37). The southeast corner includes the Great Hall, Charles Parsons Library, common rooms, and the Guilford Street entrance. This was the only part to be completed in Herbert Baker's lifetime.

Stage 2 (1948–53). The rest of the south wing, the west wing, and the northwest corner. Alexander Scott continued in Baker's style, with some simplification of detail.

Stage 3 (1961–63). The north wing, including the northeast corner. It was built to a lower cost than the other stages, without flint-work. At the same time, architect Vernon Helbing created the college chapel out of former offices.

William Goodenough House 

In the 1940s, at the instigation of the Chairman of the College Governors, William Goodenough, the Lord Mayor of London launched a Thanksgiving Fund to raise money in the U.K., and to thank people of Commonwealth countries and the United States for gifts, including food parcels, during and after World War II. The money raised was used to build William Goodenough House for women and married students from those countries, replacing houses destroyed or badly damaged in the war on the northeast of the Square. At the same time, the bombed houses in adjacent Heathcote Street were rebuilt as an annex, and the House was completed in 1957. Later wings, Julian Crossley Court (1974) and Ashley Ponsonby Court (1991), brought the capacity of the House up to 120 rooms for single students and 60 flats for married couples and families.

The two parallel institutions developed their characters over time – the quiet surroundings of the WGH common rooms appealed to some LH residents, and various "Willie G" girls preferred the noisier atmosphere of the London House bar. Traditions developed, such as the LH rugby team singing lullabies to the inhabitants of WGH after the annual sports dinner, and many LH-WGH romances flourished, and in some cases resulted in marriage and children. The two houses, London House and William Goodenough House eventually became mixed in 1991.

The Goodenough on Mecklenburgh Square

Nos. 22–25 Mecklenburgh Square survived the war and were used as a nurses’ home until 1989 when they were handed back in a dilapidated state. At first, the houses were repaired and used as inexpensive accommodation for short-stay visitors, mostly returning alumni and other academics in London to attend conferences and seminars. By 1997, however, it was apparent that the building required modernisation if they were to meet the standards that would be required in the 21st century.

The houses were closed, and plans were made to add No. 21 and renovate and upgrade for £3.5 million. There were delays because the Georgian houses are listed buildings in a conservation area, and the work required the approval of both English Heritage and the London Borough of Camden planning department. Eventually, the plans were passed, and the Goodenough Club opened in April 2001. The hotel is open to academic and professional visitors as well as conference delegates from around the world and was renamed The Goodenough on Mecklenburgh Square in 2018.

List of heads of Goodenough College

Directors of the College, 1945–present
As the name of the College and the Director's equivalent position has changed over time, the title of each appointee is given.

Wardens of London House, 1947–2008
Up until the 1970s, London House was a single-sex men-only building. The position of London House warden was abolished in 2008.

Controllers and wardens of William Goodenough House, 1950-–2007
From the instigation of William Goodenough House in 1950, it was run by a separate warden. Up until the 1970s, William Goodenough House was a single-sex women-only building, while London House was a men-only building. The position of William Goodenough House warden was abolished in 2007.

Chairmen of the board of governors, 1931–present

Notable alumni
1940s
 Sir Sydney Kentridge QC, barrister 

1950s
 The Hon. F. W. de Klerk (LH 58), former President of South Africa

1960s
 Dame Norma Restieaux (WGH 65), Associate Professor of Cardiology at the University of Otago
 Gordon Thiessen (LH 65–67), former Governor of the Bank of Canada
 The Rt Revd George Cassidy (LH 66), Bishop of Southwell and Nottingham

1970s
 The Rt Hon Sir David Lloyd Jones (LH 74–75), Lord Justice of Appeal in England and Wales and Chairman of the Law Commission
 Dr Helen Clark (WGH 75–76), former Prime Minister of New Zealand

1980s
 Paul Zed (LH 80–81), member of Canadian parliament
 Professor Edward Byrne (WGH 80–82), President and Principal of King's College, London
 Dr Jennifer Barnes (WGH 82–83), President of Murray Edwards College, Cambridge
 The Hon. Dr. Greg Selinger (LH 83–85), former Premier of Manitoba
 Karan Bilimoria, Baron Bilimoria (LH 85–87), co-founder and chairman of Cobra beer
 Dr Max Price (WGH 86–87), Vice Chancellor of the University of Cape Town
 Professor George Ellis (WGH 87–88), Emeritus Distinguished Professor of Complex Systems in the Department of Mathematics and Applied Mathematics at the University of Cape Town
 The Rt Hon Carwyn Jones (LH 88–89), First Minister of Wales

1990s
 David McGuinty MP (WGH 90–93), member of Canadian parliament
 Stuart Shilson (LH 91–93), former Assistant Private Secretary to The Queen in the Royal Household of the Sovereign of the United Kingdom 
 Stephanie Nolen (LH 93–94), journalist 
 Nicole Krauss (LH 97–98), author 
 Sergei Stanishev (LH 99–00), former Prime Minister of Bulgaria

2000s
 Ashvin Kumar (LH 01–03), filmmaker 
 Llŷr Williams (WGH 02–06), pianist 
 Scott MacIntyre (LH 05–06), former American Idol contestant 
 Lewis Pugh (WGH 05–06), environmental campaigner 
 Eoghan Murphy (LH 0 04-05), former member of Irish parliament and Irish Government Minister.
2010s

 Kola Tubosun (WGH 19-20), Nigerian writer and linguist.

See also
 International Students House, London
 International House of New York
 International Student House of Washington, D.C.

References

External links

Goodenough College website

 Educational institutions established in 1930
 Educational charities based in the United Kingdom
 Higher education colleges in London
 Education in the London Borough of Camden
 Buildings and structures in Bloomsbury
 Herbert Baker buildings and structures
 Goodenough family
 Grade II listed buildings in the London Borough of Camden
1930 establishments in England